USS Howorth (DD-592) was a  built for the United States Navy during World War II.

Namesake
William L. Howorth was born on 16 July 1841 in Massachusetts. He was appointed Acting Master's Mate on 29 April 1863. Attached to Monticello, a blockader off North Carolina, he accompanied Lieutenant William B. Cushing on a reconnaissance up the Cape Fear River to Wilmington, North Carolina 23–24 June 1864, gaining valuable information about Confederate defenses. Later in the year, he joined Cushing's expedition up the Roanoke River to sink Confederate ram . The ram was destroyed 27 October, but the launch carrying the Union sailors was destroyed. Cushing and one other man escaped, while Howorth and others were captured. In his report Cushing noted: "Acting Master's Mate William L. Howorth, of the Monticello, showed, as usual conspicuous bravery." He was promoted to Acting Master and exchanged in February 1865. Honorably discharged in October, he reentered the Navy in 1866 and was appointed Ensign on 12 March 1868. He resigned from the Navy on 4 April 1869.

Construction and commissioning
She was laid down on 26 November 1941, launched on 10 January 1943, and commissioned on 3 April 1944 at Puget Sound Naval Shipyard in Bremerton, Washington. She was the 161st ship of her class.

World War II service
After a shakedown cruise, Howorth was assigned to Destroyer Squadron 21 (DesRon 21). The flotilla set sail on 22 July 1944, as part of the escort for a convoy carrying Marines to Pearl Harbor. The convoy arrived after seven days at sea, and Howorth remained in Hawaii until 25 August, at which point she sailed for Hollandia, along with the ammunition ship . Howorth was assigned to Destroyer Division 41 (DesDiv 41), of the 7th Fleet. Her first combat experience was in the Solomon Islands on anti-submarine and escort duty.

The Philippines
Howorth arrived off Leyte on 22 October, three days after the initial landings began. She guarded the transport anchorages during the Battle of Leyte Gulf, and did not see direct action during the battle. Howorth made several convoy trips to Kossol Roads, Guam, and Manus, before returning to the Philippines for the battle at Ormoc on 7 December 1944. Howorth also participated in the Battle of Mindoro, during which she was attacked by several kamikazes, one of which slightly damaged Howorths mast before the plane crashed into the sea.

On 9 January 1945, the Invasion of Lingayen Gulf began. Howorth arrived with the first reinforcement group four days later on the 13th, which came under kamikaze attacks while en route. Howorth provided fire support to the invasion forces, provided anti-aircraft support for the invasion fleet, and patrolled the flanks of the fleet.

Iwo Jima

Howorth also took part in the invasion of Iwo Jima, arriving on 19 February. Howorth again provided fire support and anti-aircraft protection during the invasion and subsequent fighting on Iwo Jima. On 14 March, Howorth departed Iwo Jima for a short rest at Ulithi.

Okinawa
Howorth was assigned to screen a convoy from Ulithi bound for Okinawa, arriving on 1 April. After arrival at Okinawa, she again provided fire support and anti-aircraft defense. On her first day off Okinawa, Howorth was moving to her station with the cruiser  and destroyer , when she was attacked by eight kamikazes. One made it through the ships' anti-aircraft fire and struck Howorth in her superstructure, killing seven men and causing a fire that was quickly put out.

Following the damage sustained at Okinawa, Howorth returned to the United States for repairs. She arrived at Mare Island Naval Shipyard in California on 2 May 1945. Repairs were completed by early July, and after a brief shakedown cruise in July, she set sail for Pearl Harbor on 15 July. The ship was en route to Adak, Alaska on 15 August, when the news of the Japanese surrender reached the ship.

Post-war

Howorth arrived in Yokohama, Japan on 17 September, where she escorted convoys back from Japan. Her final trip from Japan was on 11 November, and arrived in San Francisco on the 28th of that month. The ship was decommissioned on 30 April 1946, and was placed in the Pacific Reserve Fleet.

Honors and awards
Howorth received five battle stars for her service during World War II.

References

External links

USS Howorth website at Destroyer History Foundation
Photos
Destroyers Online

 

World War II destroyers of the United States
Ships built in Bremerton, Washington
1943 ships
Fletcher-class destroyers of the United States Navy
Ships sunk as targets
Maritime incidents in 1962